Tamellaht is a town in the commune of Tamacine, in Témacine District, Ouargla Province, Algeria.

References

Neighbouring towns and cities

Populated places in Ouargla Province